Waterloo is a census-designated place in San Joaquin County, California. The 2020 United States census reported Waterloo's population was 670.

Geography
According to the United States Census Bureau, the CDP covers an area of 5.4 square miles (14.1 km), all of it land.

Demographics
The 2010 United States Census reported that Waterloo had a population of 572. The racial makeup of Waterloo was 450 (78.7%) White, 0 (0.0%) African American, 5 (0.9%) Native American, 21 (3.7%) Asian, 1 (0.2%) Pacific Islander, 77 (13.5%) from other races, and 18 (3.1%) from two or more races. Hispanic or Latino of any race were 152 persons (26.6%).

The Census reported that 572 people (100% of the population) lived in households, 0 (0%) lived in non-institutionalized group quarters, and 0 (0%) were institutionalized.

There were 210 households, out of which 59 (28.1%) had children under the age of 18 living in them, 137 (65.2%) were opposite-sex married couples living together, 17 (8.1%) had a female householder with no husband present, 10 (4.8%) had a male householder with no wife present.  There were 9 (4.3%) unmarried opposite-sex partnerships, and 1 (0.5%) same-sex married couples or partnerships. 38 households (18.1%) were made up of individuals, and 21 (10.0%) had someone living alone who was 65 years of age or older. The average household size was 2.72.  There were 164 families (78.1% of all households); the average family size was 3.07.

The population was spread out, with 117 people (20.5%) under the age of 18, 46 people (8.0%) aged 18 to 24, 103 people (18.0%) aged 25 to 44, 205 people (35.8%) aged 45 to 64, and 101 people (17.7%) who were 65 years of age or older.  The median age was 47.1 years. For every 100 females, there were 105.0 males.  For every 100 females age 18 and over, there were 97.0 males.

The homeowner vacancy rate was 0.6%; the rental vacancy rate was 3.8%.  421 people (73.6% of the population) lived in owner-occupied housing units and 151 people (26.4%) lived in rental housing units.

References

Census-designated places in San Joaquin County, California
Census-designated places in California